Zarelli is a surname. Notable people with the surname include:

Joseph Zarelli (born 1961), American politician
Joseph Augustus Zarelli (1953–1957), American victim of murder

See also
Alessandro Zarrelli